Anancylus socius is a species of beetle in the family Cerambycidae. It was described by Francis Polkinghorne Pascoe in 1865. It is known from the Philippines and Malaysia. It contains the varietas Anancylus socius var. dissolutus.

Subspecies
 Anancylus socius palawanicus Breuning, 1965
 Anancylus socius socius Pascoe, 1865

References

Mesosini
Beetles described in 1865